Andre Patton (born May 28, 1994) is an American football wide receiver who is a free agent. He played college football for Rutgers University, and was signed by the Los Angeles Chargers as an undrafted free agent in 2017.

High school career
Patton was a two-way starter for the St. Elizabeth Vikings football team. On offense, his senior year he had 48 catches for 761 yards and eight touchdowns and rushed for 677 yards and 14 touchdowns. On defense, Patton recorded 68 tackles and three interceptions and was named the Delaware Defensive Player of the Year by voting media and the Delaware Interscholastic Football Coaches Association.  He was rated Delaware's top recruit Rivals.com, ESPN.com and 247Sports.

College career
Patton saw game action in each of his four years at Rutgers. He finished his senior year with 33 receptions for 460, as well as 5 touchdown receptions, which lead the team and was good enough for ninth in the Big Ten.

Professional career

Los Angeles Chargers
Patton was signed by the Los Angeles Chargers as an undrafted free agent on May 1, 2017. He was waived on September 2, 2017 and was signed to the Chargers' practice squad the next day. He signed a reserve/future contract with the Chargers on January 2, 2018.

On September 1, 2018, Patton was waived by the Chargers and was signed to the practice squad the next day. He signed a reserve/future contract with the Chargers on January 14, 2019.

On August 31, 2019, Patton was waived by the Chargers and signed to the practice squad the next day. He was promoted to the active roster on September 14, 2019, but was waived three days later and re-signed back to the practice squad. He was promoted back to the active roster on September 28, 2019.

Patton was waived on August 1, 2020.

Arizona Cardinals
On August 5, 2020, Patton signed with the Arizona Cardinals. He was waived during final roster cuts on September 5, 2020, and re-signed to the practice squad a day later. He was released on October 27.

Miami Dolphins
On November 18, 2020, Patton was signed to the Miami Dolphins' practice squad. He was released on December 14, 2020, and re-signed to the practice squad the next day. His practice squad contract with the team expired after the season on January 11, 2021.

Philadelphia Eagles
On July 29, 2021, the Philadelphia Eagles signed Patton to their roster. He was waived on August 31, 2021.

References

External links 
Arizona Cardinals bio

1994 births
Living people
Players of American football from Wilmington, Delaware
American football wide receivers
Rutgers Scarlet Knights football players
Los Angeles Chargers players
Arizona Cardinals players
Miami Dolphins players
Philadelphia Eagles players